Raymond Edward Fisher (born February 12, 1934 in Charleston, Illinois) is a former American football defensive tackle in the National Football League for the Pittsburgh Steelers and Dallas Cowboys. He played college football at Eastern Illinois University.

Early years
Fisher attended Charleston High School, where he practiced football and track, while advancing to the state championship as a shot putter.

He accepted a football scholarship from Eastern Illinois University, where he lettered in football, track and wrestling.

In wrestling, he was the heavyweight conference champion in 1954 and 1955. In track, he was the conference's shot put champion in 1955. In football, he was a three-year starter at defensive tackle. He received All-IIAC in his last 2 years.

From 1956 to 1958, he played football in the U.S. Marine Corps and won the All-Service Championship in 1958.

In 1983, he was inducted into the Eastern Illinois University Athletics Hall of Fame.

Professional career

Pittsburgh Steelers
Fisher was signed as an undrafted free agent by the Pittsburgh Steelers after the 1959 NFL Draft and became a starter on the defensive line as a rookie.

Dallas Cowboys
Fisher was selected by the Dallas Cowboys in the 1960 NFL Expansion Draft. He was lost for the franchise's inaugural season after suffering a left knee injury in pre-season. He was waived on July 31, 1961.

Personal life
After retiring as a player, he became an assistant football coach with the Pittsburgh Steelers.

References

1934 births
Living people
People from Charleston, Illinois
Players of American football from Illinois
American football offensive tackles
Eastern Illinois Panthers football players
Pittsburgh Steelers players
Dallas Cowboys players
Pittsburgh Steelers coaches